The Besançon Commune (in French Commune de Besançon) was a short-lived revolutionary movement conceived and developed in 1871, aiming at the proclamation of a local autonomous power based on Lyon and Paris experiences. It originates from sociological upheavals which metamorphosed the city, and with the emergence of unions including a section of IWA in connection with the future Jura Federation. The Franco-Prussian War, the fall of the Second Empire, and the advent of the Third Republic, precipitate events. While many notables testify to an insurrectional context and armed support from Switzerland is getting organized, the correspondence left by James Guillaume and Mikhail Bakunin attest to a planned release between the end of May and the beginning of June 1871. However, with the start of the Semaine sanglante on May 21 and the pursuit of an internal campaign until June 7, any attempt was seriously compromised. Despite the hope of a restart, the weeks and months following the idea of an insurrection is definitively abandoned reinforced by the extinction of the groups and activities called anarchists from 1875.

Notes 

History of anarchism
History of Besançon
History of Franche-Comté
1871 in France
Rebellions in France